A village tract (also spelt village-tract), also called overvillage, is a fourth-level administrative subdivision of Myanmar's rural townships. As of August 2015, there are 13,602 village tracts in Myanmar, consisting of 70,838 villages. The equivalent for urban townships is a ward.

See also 
 Administrative divisions of Burma

References

Subdivisions of Myanmar
Burma 4
Village tract, Burma